Nothing in the Fridge is a 1998 Spanish comedy film directed by Álvaro Fernández Armero which stars María Esteve and Coque Malla.

Plot 
Carlota works a ambulance driver for the SAMUR. She becomes infatuated with a porno-comic artist (Number One), whom she meets with after the latter suffers an indigestion from eating ten hard-boiled eggs. A trail of misunderstandings between them ensue.

Cast

Production 
The screenplay was penned by siblings Coloma Fernández Armero and Álvaro Fernández Armero. The film was produced by Boca Boca alongside Aurum, and it had the participation of Antena 3 and Canal+.

Release 
Distributed by Columbia TriStar, the film was theatrically released in Spain on 23 October 1998.

Reception 
Jonathan Holland of Variety deemed the film to be a "a superficially pleasant comedy with dark undertones", featuring "a nice contempo feel and the occasional thought-provoking moment".

Accolades 

|-
| align = "center" | 1999 || 13th Goya Awards || Best New Actress || María Esteve ||  || align = "center" | 
|}

See also 
 List of Spanish films of 1998

References 

Films set in Madrid
1998 comedy films
1990s Spanish-language films
Spanish comedy films
1990s Spanish films